Statistics of the Yemeni League for the 1983–84 season.

Results

North Yemen

South Yemen

References

Yemeni League seasons
1984 in Yemeni sport
1983 in Yemeni sport